The Raven is a wooden roller coaster at Holiday World & Splashin' Safari's Halloween section in Santa Claus, Indiana, United States. It began to be designed and built in 1994 by the now-defunct roller coaster manufacturer Custom Coasters International, with the help of designers Dennis McNulty and Larry Bill. The roller coaster opened on May 6, 1995. The Raven takes its name from Edgar Allan Poe's poem "The Raven" and features sudden drops and turns which mimic the flight of a raven. From 2000 to 2003, The Raven was voted the world's "Best Wooden Roller Coaster" at the Golden Ticket Awards, which are presented annually by Amusement Today magazine. It was named an "ACE Roller Coaster Landmark" by American Coaster Enthusiasts on June 23, 2016.

History

Development
Plans for a new wooden roller coaster were first conceived by park President Will Koch. Koch contacted Custom Coasters International and plans for the then-unnamed roller coaster began to form. The roller coaster remained unnamed until August 1994, when Koch invited magazine editor and fellow amusement park lover Tim O'Brien to tour the site of the future roller coaster. During that tour it was O'Brien who first suggested the name The Raven, deriving the idea from Edgar Allan Poe's poem "The Raven". The name was soon made official and construction on The Raven began.

On May 6, 1995, The Raven was opened to riders for the first time. The roller coaster debuted with a single 24-passenger train made by the Philadelphia Toboggan Company. The ceremonial first train was dispatched with one empty seat, after Leah Koch, the daughter of park President Will Koch, opted not to ride. The seat was instead reserved for the spirit of Edgar Allan Poe, who had published his poem "The Raven" exactly 150 years earlier.

Changes
In 2005, The Raven received a second train, bringing the ride's total to two 24-passenger PTC trains. Although the ride had been able to effectively handle the crowds up to that point, adding the second train improved The Raven's capacity from 700 riders per hour to 960 riders per hour.

In order to accommodate and store the second train when it was not being used, a transfer track was built along the straightaway prior to the lift hill. A transfer track allows a portion of the track to be moved and redirected to a storage bay. This allows an unused train to be stored during normal operation and also provides an additional area for maintenance crews to inspect the roller coaster train.

The change to two train operation also necessitated a change in the roller coaster's control system. Prior to 2005, the ride was operated manually by the ride operator, who had to push a button to release the brakes and position the train in the station. This type of control system allowed the ride to be operated by a single ride operator. In 2005, an automatic control system was added. The automatic control system automatically controls braking, positioning, and the block system, which prevents the two trains from colliding with each other. This type of control system also necessitates that two ride operators be present to dispatch the train from the station.

During the 2020-2021 off-season, The Raven was given a refurbishment. The ride's trains were repainted with wings on both sides and 25% of the track was replaced.

Ride experience

The total ride experience on The Raven lasts approximately one minute and thirty seconds.

The ride begins with riders in the station facing the entrance to the ride. Immediately after dispatch the train takes a 180° turn over the queue area and into the transfer track, which runs parallel to the station. After passing through the transfer track, the train dips down and under the final brake run before latching onto the lift hill chain. The lift hill chain takes the train up to the top of the hill. Once at the top of the lift hill, the train dips down a little and makes a turn to the right as riders overlook the park's main entrance and the parking lot. The train then dives down its initial  drop at almost .

After exiting the tunnel the train goes back up another hill before making a slight turn to the right and heading back down again for the ride's second small drop. Following the second drop the train crests the top of a small hill in preparation for a large, sweeping right turn over Lake Rudolph. This turn is considered one of the more photogenic elements of the ride. The turn over Lake Rudolph is a full 180° turn and sends the train back uphill before making a left turn so that the train is now parallel to the top of the second hill. At this point the train dips down and returns uphill in a simultaneous left turn.

Once the train has crested the top of the hill, it enters its  drop, which is also commonly referred to as the "fifth drop". Following the drop, the train hugs the ground through thickly-wooded terrain while traversing a banked "S" curve, first to the right and then to the left. The train then takes a second large, sweeping right turn. At the conclusion of the right turn, the train makes a quick left turn and immediately enters the brake run to end the ride. If there are two trains operating, the train will wait in the brake run until the second train has left the station. If not, the train will continue directly into the station at which point riders will unload.

Characteristics

Station
The Raven's station is Gothic-themed, resembling a house one may find in the early 1800s, which was the time period Edgar Allan Poe published the ride's theming inspiration, "The Raven". The station has two accessible levels, though it is three or four stories tall in appearance. The first story of the station is at ground level; however, before entering the station, guests will encounter multiple, outdoor queue switchbacks. Once the switchbacks have been navigated, guests will walk directly under part of the roller coaster's track and into the station. The first story of the station features only a small porch and a staircase leading up to the second story. The second story of the station holds the roller coaster's loading and unloading areas. On the loading side of the station there are twelve air-powered queue gates, one for each row of the train. The loading side is also the location of the ride operator's controls. On the unloading side of the station there are free shelves and lockers that riders may use to hold their belongings for the duration of the ride. The unloading side is also the location of a single exit gate.

Trains
The Raven uses two red, 24-passenger trains made by the Philadelphia Toboggan Company. Each train is made up of six cars that hold four riders each. Each car has two rows holding two riders each. Each row has a seat divider that separates the two riders in that row and ensures each rider remains in a position allowing their restraints to work effectively. The Raven's safety restraints include an individual ratcheting lap bar and an individual, two-point lap belt.

Track
The wooden track on The Raven is made out of numerous layers of Southern Yellow Pine, topped with a single layer of steel along the top, sides, and underside of the track where the train's wheels make contact. The supports for the track itself are wooden as well. The track features a chain lift hill and three block sections, which allows a maximum of two trains to operate at a time. The Raven uses fin brakes throughout the ride to allow the train to be stopped in the brake run, the station, and the transfer track.

Incidents
On May 31, 2003, Tamar Fellner, a 32-year-old woman from New York City, New York, died after falling out of The Raven roller coaster. Fellner was visiting the park to attend "Stark Raven Mad 2003", an event hosting roller coaster enthusiasts from around the country. At approximately 8:00 pm, Fellner and her fiancé boarded The Raven in the last row of the train. Following a safety check of her lap bar and seat belt by a ride operator, the train left the station. Multiple witnesses reported that they saw Fellner "virtually standing up" during the ride's initial and subsequent drops. During the ride's  drop, also called the fifth drop, Fellner was ejected from the car and onto the tracks. When the train returned to the station, Fellner's fiancé, ride operators, and a passenger who was a doctor ran back along the tracks, at which point they found Fellner lying under the structure of the roller coaster at the fifth drop. The doctor, aided by park medical personnel, began CPR until an ambulance arrived. Fellner was pronounced dead en route to the hospital.

An investigation following the accident showed that Fellner's safety restraints were working properly and that there were no mechanical deficiencies on the roller coaster. However, Fellner's family filed a lawsuit in 2005 against Holiday World and the Philadelphia Toboggan Company, the manufacturer of the roller coaster train. The lawsuit was settled out of court in 2007; terms of the settlement were not disclosed.

Awards

References

External links
Official website for The Raven at Holiday World & Splashin' Safari
Official YouTube video of The Raven posted by Holiday World & Splashin' Safari

Holiday World & Splashin' Safari
Roller coasters in Indiana
Roller coasters introduced in 1995
Works of Edgar Allan Poe in popular culture